The Al-Kadhimi Government is the current government of Iraq (as of December 2021), led by Prime Minister Mustafa Al-Kadhimi. It was formed on 6 May 2020 after extensive negotiations.

References 

Cabinets of Iraq
Cabinets established in 2020
Current governments
2020 establishments in Iraq